Hvalimir is an extinct Serbian given name, that may refer to:

Hvalimir Belojević, Duke of Travunia, ruled in late 9th century
Hvalimir, mythological Prince of Zeta, Travunia and Podgoria, supposedly late 10th century

Serbian masculine given names